The 2008 Mid-American Conference men's basketball tournament was won by the #1 seed Kent State Golden Flashes, who defeated their arch-rival and #3 seed Akron Zips 74–55 in front of 12,942 fans.  Kent State center Haminn Quaintance led all scorers with 16 points and was named the tournament MVP.

The basketball tournament took place March 12 through March 15 at Quicken Loans Arena in Cleveland.  FSN Ohio televised the quarterfinals and semifinals while ESPN2 broadcast the tournament championship nationally.

Format
Each of the 12 men's basketball teams in the MAC received a berth in the conference tournament.  Teams were seeded by conference record with the following tie-breakers:
 Head-to-head competition
 Winning percentage vs. ranked conference teams (top to bottom, regardless of division, vs. common opponents regardless of the number of times played)
 Coin flip

The top four seeds received byes into the quarterfinals.  The winners of each division were awarded the #1 and #2 seeds.  The team with the best record of the two received the #1 seed.

Tiebreakers
 Ohio received No. 4 seed based on 1–1 record vs. No. 1 Kent State; Miami was 0–2 vs. Kent State. Ohio and Miami split the season series 1–1.
 Central Michigan received No. 6 seed based on 1–0 record vs. No. 3 Akron; EMU was 0–1 vs. Akron. CMU and EMU split the season series 1–1 and had the same record vs. No. 1 Kent State (0–1) and No. 2 WMU (1–1).

Bracket

All-tournament team
 Al Fisher (Kent State)
 Haminn Quaintance (Kent State)
 Joe Reitz (Western Michigan)
 Mike Scott (Kent State)
 Jeremiah Wood (Akron)

See also
 Mid-American Conference men's basketball tournament

References

External links
 MAC Tournament Central

Mid-American Conference men's basketball tournament
Tournament
MAC men's basketball tournament
MAC men's basketball tournament
Basketball in Cleveland